The 2016–17 Texas–Arlington Mavericks women's basketball team represented the University of Texas at Arlington in the 2016–17 NCAA Division I women's basketball season. The Mavericks, led by fourth year head coach Krista Gerlich, played their home games at the College Park Center and were members of the Sun Belt Conference. They finished the season 22–9, 14–4 in Sun Belt play to finish in second place. They advanced to the semifinals of the Sun Belt women's tournament where they lost to Troy. They were invited to the WNIT where they lost to Tulane in the first round.

Roster

Schedule

|-
!colspan=9 style="background:#0064b1; color:white;"| Non-conference regular season

|-
!colspan=9 style="background:#0064b1; color:white;"| Sun Belt regular season

|-
!colspan=9 style="background:#0064b1; color:white;"| Sun Belt Women's Tournament

|-
!colspan=9 style="background:#0064b1; color:white;"| Women's National Invitation Tournament

See also
 2016–17 Texas–Arlington Mavericks men's basketball team

References

Texas-Arlington
UT Arlington Mavericks women's basketball seasons
2017 Women's National Invitation Tournament participants